Anderson Canyon  in the Big Sur region of California was named after pioneering homesteaders James and Peter Andersen who were the first European settlers of the area. The canyon, Anderson Creek, and Anderson Peak are south of McWay Falls and within the boundaries of Julia Pfeiffer Burns State Park.

During construction of Highway One  in the 1920s and '30s, it was the location of a convict work camp. After the camp closed, literary bohemians like Henry Miller rented the shacks, forming what Miller later called the "Anderson Creek Gang".

The canyon is within the boundaries of the Monterey Bay National Marine Sanctuary, Sea Otter Refuge, and California condor reintroduction area.

Early history 

Pino Palado Peak, the name given the peak during the Mexican era, is said to refer to a tall Ponderosa pine, “peeled” of its bark by a lightning strike, that at one time grew on the southeastern summit. The creek was named after the peak. The modern name is a corruption of the surname of settlers James Andersen, who emigrated from Denmark in 1874 and homesteaded in the canyon, and his brother Peter, who arrived in 1883. The Andersen family had business ties to many of the early settlers in the region, including the Pfeiffers, Slates, and Danis.

In the late 19th century a trail was constructed that connected the coast ridge with the coast at Burns Creek, just south of Anderson Landing.

Before construction of Highway One, local residents harvested redwood and tanbark, and mined limestone and gold. These resources were shipped out of dog-hole ports located in the region including Saddle Rock Landing at the mouth of Anderson Creek. It was named due to its proximity (.4 miles) to Saddle Rock, a prominent sea shore feature of present-day Julia Pfeiffer Burns State Park.

The Anderson Canyon region was homesteaded by Aaron Harlan in the 1880s, located about a mile up the canyon from the mouth of the creek. "Pop" Ernest Doelter, a Monterey, CA restaurateur who created the abalone steak owned the Saddle Rock Landing for abalone harvesting. Pop's restaurant was a favorite of George Sterling, Jack London, and Andrew Molera.

Highway construction 

The  section of Highway One between Anderson Canyon and Big Sur was completed in October, 1924. In 1926, construction was halted due to lack of funds. Anderson Canyon was the southern terminus of the road. Construction of the southern portion resumed in 1928, and in 1932, Anderson canyon was selected as the site of the largest prison labor camp on the coast. From the Anderson Canyon camp, the highway was built south to connect with the road at Big Creek. Anderson Canyon was the last labor camp built. The entire highway was completed and opened on June 17, 1937.

Bohemians 

After the Highway was complete, many buildings were left standing on the site from its use as a convict camp. During the 1940 and early 1950s, these cabins were rented out to early Bohemians. Henry Miller lived in a shack in Anderson Canyon from 1944 to 1947.

Other residents included  avant-garde musician Harry Partch, Emil White, and collagist Jean Varda. Author Elizabeth Smart also lived at Anderson Canyon. Her novella, By Grand Central Station I Sat Down and Wept (1945) may be the first fiction regarding Big Sur's bohemian residents.

Miller wrote "Into the Nightlife" while living there, and he described his fellow artists as the "Anderson Creek Gang" in Big Sur and the Oranges of Hieronymus Bosch. Miller paid $5 per month rent for his shack on the property.

Bluff-top home 

In 1965, Tony Staude, former chairman of pharmaceutical wholesaler Bergen Brunswig, and his wife, sculptor Marguerite Brunswig, bought the property. They found abandoned cars and remnants of the convict labor camp, including the former infirmary.  They hired Carmel architect George-Brook Kothlow, who had designed other Big Sur dwellings, to design a residence. Staude and his wife had previously been instrumental in designing and financing Chapel of the Holy Cross in Sedona, Arizona. In 1969, they used reclaimed redwood timbers that had formerly been used to build a coastal bridge to construct a  two bedroom and two bath circular home on the tip of the bluff overlooking the sea. The home became known as the Staude House. After Staude's death in 2006, David F. Brubaker, a former employee of Staude, and his wife, photographer Dani Brubaker, purchased the home and land. The Brubakers applied for a permit to demolish the caretaker house and replace it with a slightly larger home, but never completed the project. The site was used on occasion for weddings.

In January, 2014, The Brubakers sold the Staude home along with a caretaker dwelling and two studios on two parcels totaling  of land for $31,394,000 to Ankle Crisper LLC, owned or represented by attorney Ralph Arnheim of Palo Alto. In 2016, the new owners learned from a survey that the caretaker unit on Parcel A extended  over the property line into the state park. They were granted a permit from Monterey County to demolish the building. They also removed an accessory unit visible from Highway 1, which as a result of the passage of the Big Sur Land Use plan, was a violating use. They built a new  residence and a new accessory building east of Highway 1, all outside the critical view shed in which new buildings are prohibited.

Ecology and biology 

In 2006, two condors were discovered nesting in a hollowed out, partially burned redwood tree. These were the first natural birth of a condor in California since 1905.

In 2011, PG&E began a $4.2 million project to bury power lines running from Highway One up Anderson Canyon to Anderson Peak in order to protect condors from potential electrocution.

Anderson Canyon is an upland redwood forest. Characteristic species include coastal redwood, California bay, tanbark oak, big-leaf maple, and western sword fern. Wildlife species that may occur in this community include ensatina, Pacific slender salamander, Pacific giant salamander, western-screech owl, Allen's hummingbird, purple martin, acorn woodpecker, Steller's jay, Townsend's western big-eared bat, and pallid bat.

Film credits 

Anderson Canyon appears in many films and photoshoots including National Geographic's Big Sur: Wild California, the Richard Burton and Liz Taylor classic The Sandpiper, and more recently in a feature film based on Jack Kerouac's Big Sur. Anderson Canyon also stands in for the Esalen Institute setting in the series finale of the television show Mad Men.

See also 

 List of rivers in California
 Carmel Bay State Marine Conservation Area
 Big Sur River
 Little Sur River
 Geography of California
 Notleys Landing, California

References

External links 

  Big Sur and the Oranges of Hieronymus Bosch
 Anderson Canyon
 Photos of Henry Miller at Anderson Canyon
 GNIS Detail:Anderson Canyon
 GNIS Detail: Anderson Creek
 Elmer Staude Obituary

Geography of Monterey County, California
Monterey Ranger District, Los Padres National Forest
Regions of California
Big Sur